The Crato Formation is a geologic formation of Early Cretaceous (Aptian) age in northeastern Brazil's Araripe Basin. It is an important Lagerstätte (undisturbed fossil accumulation) for palaeontologists. The strata were laid down mostly during the Aptian age, about 113 million years ago. It thought to have been deposited in a semi-arid lacustrine wetland environment.

The Crato Formation earns the designation of Lagerstätte due to an exceedingly well preserved and diverse fossil faunal assemblage. Some 25 species of fossil fishes are often found with stomach contents preserved, enabling paleontologists to study predator-prey relationships in this ecosystem. There are also fine examples of pterosaurs, reptiles and amphibians, invertebrates (particularly insects), and plants. Even dinosaurs are represented: a new maniraptor was described in 1996. The unusual taphonomy of the site resulted in limestone accretions that formed nodules around dead organisms, preserving even soft parts of their anatomy.

History 

Fish fossils in the area were noted in 1823. When they were first methodically published, in 1993, the Crato Formation limestones provided a new site for pterosaurs, one that also preserved insects that fell into a brackish lagoon and semionotid fish preserved in phosphatized nodules. The fossils are usually compacted and preserved in layers of limestone. Fossil Odonata (dragonflies) and damselflies are especially rich in the Crato lagerstätte: currently 384 specimens have been recovered, 264 adults and 120 larvae. Hemiptera (true bugs) and Orthoptera (grasshoppers and crickets) are also abundant in number of species and in number of specimens. There are also plant remains.

Local mining activities for cement and construction damage the sites. Trade in illegally collected fossils has sprung up in the last decade, driven by the remarkable state of preservation and beauty of these fossils and amounting to a considerable local industry. An urgent preservation program is being called for by paleontologists.

In addition, the weathering of Crato and Santana Formation rocks has contributed soil conditions unlike elsewhere in the region. The Araripe manakin (Antilophia bokermanni) is a very rare bird that was discovered only in the late 20th century; it is not known from anywhere outside the characteristic forest that grows on the Chapada do Araripe soils formed ultimately from Crato and Santana Formation rocks.

Definition 

The Crato Formation has often historically been considered the lowest member of the Santana Formation (or, alternatively, the Araripina Formation) of the Araripe Group, later redefined as the Romualdo Formation of the Santana Group. The Crato Member is the product of a single phase, where complicated sequence of sediment strata reflect changeable conditions in the opening sea. The age of this strata has been controversial, though most workers have agreed that it lies on or near the Aptian-Albian boundary, about 112 million years ago.

The extent of the Crato unit and its relationship to the Romualdo Formation had long been ill-defined. It was not until a 2007 volume on the unit by Martill, Bechly and Loveridge that the Crato Formation was given a formal type locality, and was formally made a distinct formation separate from the Santana, which is about 10 Ma younger. The Crato Formation is considered time equivalent with the Paracuru Formation.

Fossil content

Insects 
(Note: Many more insects have been described than are present in the table below)

Arachnids

Fish

Amphibians

Squamata

Dinosaurs

Crocodylomorphs

Pterosaurs

Flora

Other fossils 

 Araripenaeus timidus
 †Cratoalloneura
 †Cratoalloneura acuminata
 †Cratoalloneura verdandia
 †Cratoatractocerus
 †Cratoatractocerus grimaldii
 †Cratoborellia
 †Cratoborellia gorbi
 †Cratochrysa
 †Cratochrysa martinsnetoi
 †Cratochrysa sublapsa
 †Cratochrysa willmanni
 †Cratocora
 †Cratocora crassa
 †Cratocordulia
 †Cratocordulia borschukewitzi
 †Cratocoris
 †Cratocoris shevchenkoae
 †Cratocorydalopsis
 †Cratocorydalopsis brasiliensis
 †Cratocossus
 †Cratocossus magnus
 †Cratodactylus
 †Cratodactylus ferreirai
 †Cratodactylus kellneri
 †Cratoelcana
 †Cratoelcana damianii
 †Cratoelcana zessini
 †Cratoenigma
 †Cratoenigma articulata
 †Cratogomphus
 †Cratogomphus erraticus
 †Cratogryllus
 †Cratogryllus cigueli
 †Cratogryllus guimaraesae
 †Cratogryllus pentagonalis
 †Cratohagenius
 †Cratohagenius erichweberi
 †Cratohaglopsis
 †Cratohaglopsis santanaensis
 †Cratohexagenites
 †Cratohexagenites longicercus
 †Cratohexagenites minor
 †Cratokalotermes
 †Cratokalotermes santanensis
 †Cratolindenia
 †Cratolindenia knuepfae
 †Cratolocustopsis
 †Cratolocustopsis araripensis
 †Cratolocustopsis contumax’ – type locality for species
 †Cratolocustopsis cretacea
 †Cratomacer
 †Cratomacer ephippiger
 †Cratomacer immersus
 †Cratomastotermes
 †Cratomastotermes wolfschwenningeri
 †Cratomyia
 †Cratomyia cretacica
 †Cratomyia macrorrhyncha
 †Cratonemonyx
 †Cratonemonyx martinsnetoi
 †Cratonemopteryx
 †Cratonemopteryx audax
 †Cratonemopteryx robusta
 †Cratonemopteryx speciosa
 †Cratonepa
 †Cratonepa enigmatica
 †Cratonerthra
 †Cratonerthra corinthiana
 †Cratonerthra estevezae
 †Cratoneura
 †Cratoneura dividens
 †Cratoneura longissima
 †Cratoneura pulchella
 †Cratonympha
 †Cratonympha microcelata
 †Cratopelocoris
 †Cratopelocoris carpinteroi
 †Cratopetalia
 †Cratopetalia whiteheadi
 †Cratopetalura
 †Cratopetalura petruleviciusi
 †Cratopetalura petruleviciusi
 †Cratopsychopsis
 †Cratopsychopsis maiseyi
 †Cratopteryx
 †Cratopteryx nemopteroides
 †Cratopteryx robertosantosi
 †Cratoraricrus
 †Cratoraricrus oberlii
 †Cratoscalapha
 †Cratoscalapha electroneura
 †Cratosirex
 †Cratosirex sennlaubi
 †Cratosisyrops
 †Cratosisyrops gonzagai
 †Cratosmylus
 †Cratosmylus magnificus
 †Cratostenophlebia
 †Cratostenophlebia schwickerti
 †Cratotabanus
 †Cratotabanus stonemyomorphus
 †Cratotetraspinus
 †Cratotetraspinus fossorius
 †Cratotipula
 †Cratotipula latialata
 †Cratovitisma
 †Cratovitisma oldreadi
 †Cratovoluptia
 †Cratovoluptia criptoneura
 †Cratozeunerella
 †Cratozeunerella amedegnatoi
 †Cratozeunerella godoii
 †Cratozeunerella neotropica
 †Cratozeunerella nervosa
 †Cratozeunerella soaresi
 †Cratozeunerella titanella

See also 

 Araripe Basin
 Botucatu Formation
 Elrhaz Formation
 Itapecuru Formation
 Quiricó Formation

References

Bibliography

Further reading 
 
 
 
 

 
Geologic formations of Brazil
Lower Cretaceous Series of South America
Cretaceous Brazil
Mudstone formations
Limestone formations
Deltaic deposits
Lacustrine deposits
Paleontology in Brazil
Environment of Ceará
Environment of Pernambuco
Environment of Piauí
Landforms of Ceará
Landforms of Pernambuco
Landforms of Piauí
Northeast Region, Brazil